The badminton men's singles tournament at the 2018 Asian Games in Jakarta took place from 23 to 28 August at Istora Gelora Bung Karno.

Schedule
All times are Western Indonesia Time (UTC+07:00)

Results

Finals

Top half

Section 1

Section 2

Bottom half

Section 3

Section 4

References

External links
Schedule

Badminton at the 2018 Asian Games